The Oceanic island nation of Kiribati competed at the 2012 Summer Olympics in London, held from July 27 – August 12, 2012. This was the nation's third appearance at the Olympics.

Three athletes from Kiribati were selected to compete in the Olympics: two in athletics and one in weightlifting. Kiribati also planned to send two athletes to compete in boxing, but the nation failed to qualify. Weightlifter David Katoatau, the oldest member of the delegation, reprised his role as national flag bearer at the opening ceremony. Kiribati has yet to win its first Olympic medal.

Background

Kiribati had interest in Olympic participation in the 1980s, and the country later formed their National Olympic Committee (NOC) in 2002, which was recognized by the International Olympic Committee (IOC) in 2003. Kiribati's first Games was in 2004. The 2012 Olympics were Kiribati's third Games. In past Games, I-Kiribatis have participated in weightlifting and athletics.

David Katoatau was selected as Kiribati's opening ceremonies flag bearer for the second consecutive Olympics. He was also the flag bearer for the closing ceremonies. As of these Olympics, Kiribati has not won an Olympic medal.

Athletics

Nooa Takooa competed at age 19 in the men's 100 meter dash, his first Olympic appearance. Takooa finished with a time of 11.53 seconds, seventh in his heat and 25th out of 29 overall. Takooa's time was a personal best, but he did not advance to the next round.

The 2012 Olympics were 17-year old Kaingaue David's first Games. She competed in the women's 100 meter event, finishing the preliminary heat with a personal best time of 13.61 seconds. David finished last in her heat and 29th out of 33 in the preliminary round.

Key

Men

Women

Weightlifting

These Games were David Katoatau's second Olympics. He became the first I-Kiribati in the country's history to qualify for the Olympics on merit. Katoatau competed in the men's 94 kg weightlifting group. He placed 17th in the competition, with a snatch of 140, a clean and jerk of 185, combined for a total of 325.

References

Nations at the 2012 Summer Olympics
2012
Oly